Stade Al Inbiaâte is a multi-use stadium in Agadir, Morocco.  It is currently used mostly for football matches and hosts the home games of Hassania Agadir.  The stadium can hold up to 10,000 people.

History 
The stadium was constructed in 1960 and is one of the most symbolic stadiums in Morocco.
It was replaced by Stade d'Agadir in December 2009 as the official stadium of HUS Agadir, local football team in Agadir.
Since 2011, it was equipped with artificial turf instead of natural grass.

Official stadium 
After Hassania Agadir moved its official stadium to Stade d'Agadir, Stade Al Inbiaâte became the official stadium of Raja Agadir and Najah Souss.

References

Football venues in Morocco
Buildings and structures in Agadir
Hassania Agadir